Dearne South is a ward in the Dearne Valley in the metropolitan borough of Barnsley, South Yorkshire, England.  The ward contains five listed buildings that are recorded in the National Heritage List for England.  Of these, one is listed at Grade I, the highest of the three grades, and the others are at Grade II, the lowest grade.  The ward contains the village of Bolton upon Dearne, and all the listed buildings are in the village.  These consist of a church, a farmhouse and farm buildings, and a war memorial.


Key

Buildings

References

Citations

Sources

 

Lists of listed buildings in South Yorkshire
Buildings and structures in the Metropolitan Borough of Barnsley